Aníbal González Irizarry (February 25, 1927 – November 14, 2018) was a Puerto Rican educator, journalist and news broadcaster.

Early years
González Irizarry was born and raised in Sabana Grande, Puerto Rico, where he received his primary and secondary education.  He completed 3 years of high school at Sabana Grande High School before his family moved to San Juan. There he attended the "Escuela Superior Central" (Central High School) of Santurce.  In 1942, when he was 15 years old, he began to work at "WPRA" a radio station in Mayaguez and soon became the station's main broadcaster.

Radio broadcaster
In 1950, González Irizarry moved to New York City to work in a factory. Whilst there he found a position at the radio station "WWRL" in a program called "La Voz Hispana del Aire" (The Hispanic Voice on the Air). In that program, he created a character which he called "Monje Loco" (Crazy Monk). In 1951, he joined the radio station "WENX" and was named Director of Spanish Programs.

In 1953, González Irizarry joined the United States Army and after returning from the Korean War was honorably discharged. He then returned to New York and continued to work in the radio as a broadcaster. He enrolled and graduated from "The School of Radio and Television Techniques".

News anchor
In 1956, González Irizarry returned to Puerto Rico and joined WKAQ, a Telemundo affiliate as its radio program announcer. He continued his academic career and graduated with a Law Degree from the University of Puerto Rico School of Law. Telemundo first introduced Telenoticias (TV News) in 1954 and in 1977, Telenoticias en Accion in a new format with him as main anchor along with Ramon Enrique Torres, Bruni Vélez and Junior Abrams.

Later years and death
González Irizarry married Ruth Perez Perez and they had two children: Anibal Jr. and Lissette. In 1994 he retired as anchor of Telenoticias en Accion in Telemundo. Besides news broadcasting, González Irizarry taught Communications at the Universidad del Sagrado Corazón in Santurce. He was the co-pastor of the Disciples of Christ Church in Ponce. and also served as spokesperson for Medicare advanced health plans in Puerto Rico. González Irizarry died on November 14, 2018, of natural causes at Pavia hospital in Santurce, Puerto Rico.

See also

List of Puerto Ricans

References

1927 births
2018 deaths
United States Army personnel of the Korean War
Christian Church (Disciples of Christ) clergy
People from Sabana Grande, Puerto Rico
Puerto Rican journalists
Puerto Rican television personalities
Puerto Rican Disciples of Christ
Puerto Rican Army personnel
Television pioneers
United States Army soldiers
University of Puerto Rico alumni
Puerto Rican Christians
Puerto Rican lawyers
Puerto Rican news anchors
Universidad del Sagrado Corazón alumni